The Men's 100 metre freestyle swimming events for the 2020 Summer Paralympics took place at the Tokyo Aquatics Centre from August 25 to September 1, 2021. A total of six events were contested over this distance.

Schedule

Medal summary
The following is a summary of the medals awarded across all 100 metre freestyle events.

Results
The following were the results of the finals only of each of the Men's 100 metre freestyle events in each of the classifications. Further details of each event, including where appropriate heats and semi finals results, are available on that event's dedicated page.

S4

The S4 category is for swimmers who have function in their hands and arms but can't use their trunk or legs to swim. Swimmers in this class can also have three amputated limbs.

The final in this classification took place on 26 August 2021:

S5

The S5 category is for swimmers who have hemiplegia, paraplegia or short stature.

The final in this classification took place on 26 August 2021:

S6

The S6 category is for swimmers who have short stature, arm amputations, or some form of coordination problem on one side of their body.

The final in this classification took place on 1 September 2021:

S8

The S8 category is for swimmers who have a single amputation, or restrictive movement in their hip, knee and ankle joints.

The final in this classification took place on 25 August 2021:

S10

The S10 category is for swimmers who have minor physical impairments, for example, loss of one hand.

The final in this classification took place on 28 August 2021:

S12

The S12 category is for swimmers who have moderate visual impairment and have a visual field of less than 5 degrees radius. They are required to wear blackened goggles to compete. They may wish to use a tapper.

The final in this classification took place on 31 August 2021:

References

Swimming at the 2020 Summer Paralympics